Where the Money Is is a 2000 American crime comedy-drama film directed by Marek Kanievska, written by E. Max Frye, and starring Paul Newman, Linda Fiorentino and Dermot Mulroney. The film, a box office failure, was Newman's second-to-last live-action theatrical release, though he would continue doing award-winning voice-over and live action television work for a number of years. It has also to date been Fiorentino's last theatrically released film.

Plot
Professional thief Henry Manning is in an Oregon nursing home's care. Having apparently had a massive stroke, he is immobile and mute. Henry is in the care of Carol Ann McKay, a high school prom queen who married her boyfriend Wayne, the prom king and star of her school's football team.

Carol Ann is mesmerized by the fact that Henry was such a successful bank robber, having eluded the police for 30 years.  But she starts to suspect Henry isn't as sick as he seems. She attempts to get a rise out of him by doing a lap dance, but fails. So convinced is she that Henry is faking, she gives him the ultimate test, pushing Henry and his wheelchair off a pier into the water, defying him to swim or die.  

Wayne arrives just as this is happening and dives in after him, but a few moments later, Henry walks out of the lake and obviously has to admit he's been faking it to both of them. Exposed as a fraud, Henry is at least relieved to be able to walk and talk again. They take him to a local bar to hear his explanation.

Preferring a nursing home to prison as a means of escape, Henry had studied yoga and vajrayana as a way to fake the symptoms of a stroke. Soon he is dancing and drinking with them. When the couple are distracted dancing, Henry sneaks off with Wayne's car.

The next day, Henry is once again back at the home, to Carol's surprise. She continues to sporadically take him out. One day soon thereafter, Carol approaches Henry with the idea of robbing the local bank. Henry tells her she has lost her mind, but soon afterwards, he changes his mind.

The plan soon morphs into an armored transport heist with Henry coaching Carol in how to case the armoured vehicles out. Wayne gets suspicious so she lets him think she'd planned on his participation all along. They each have specific roles in the upcoming event. Although the night-long heist hits a couple rough spots, it is successful.

The next day, Henry is scheduled to be transferred back to prison. Carol Ann feels bad for him, intercepts the transfer, and breaks him free. Upon arriving home to pick up Wayne, Carol and Henry discover Wayne has sold them out. 

As the police surround the house, Wayne walks out the front door to give himself up. Moments later, Henry and Carol bust out the back in Wayne's car. Henry drops Carol off in the middle of the woods to get away on foot with the loot, and as the police are pursuing him, he drives Wayne's car into a lake and is presumed dead, leaving Wayne to take the fall.

In the final scene, Henry and Carol Ann are shown at a jewelry store whose security system mysteriously stopped working. She convinces the sole sales assistant to cut off her wedding ring in the back room with Henry left out front, pretending to be wheelchair bound again and preparing for a new heist.

Cast

References

External links
 
 
 

2000 films
2000 crime films
2000s crime comedy films
2000s heist films
American crime comedy films
American heist films
2000s English-language films
Films directed by Marek Kanievska
Films scored by Mark Isham
PolyGram Filmed Entertainment films
Gramercy Pictures films
Scott Free Productions films
USA Films films
2000s American films